Ryan O'Leary (born 24 August 1987) a Scottish former professional footballer who played as a defender. O'Leary is the son of former Republic of Ireland international footballer Pierce O'Leary and the nephew of David O'Leary.

Club career
O'Leary attended St. Aloysius' College, Glasgow. He started his football career with Aberdeen and joined Kilmarnock for an undisclosed fee in 2005. After appearing sporadically for Kilmarnock due to injuries, Gordon Chisholm signed O'Leary for Dundee on loan until the end of the 2009–10 season.

O'Leary left Kilmarnock when his contract expired in 2010 taking nine months out of football for personal reasons. However, after failing to win a deal at Vancouver Whitecaps following a trial, he returned to Kilmarnock and signed a short-term deal in March 2011.

International career
In February 2007 he was named in a Republic of Ireland under-21 squad, but he declined, choosing to represent the country of his birth instead. He subsequently represented Scotland at under–21 level.

Acting career 
O'Leary portrays Davey Gunn in CBC Television's sports drama 21 Thunder and is credited as Ryan Pierce. The series premiered in Canada on 31 July 2017.

References

External links
 
 Ryan O'Leary profile at Kilmarnockfc.co.uk
 

Living people
1987 births
Footballers from Glasgow
Scottish people of Irish descent
Association football defenders
Scottish footballers
Scotland youth international footballers
Scotland under-21 international footballers
Aberdeen F.C. players
Kilmarnock F.C. players
Dundee F.C. players
Orange County SC players
Scottish Premier League players
Scottish Football League players
USL Championship players
Scottish expatriate footballers
Scottish expatriate sportspeople in the United States
Expatriate soccer players in the United States